Humbel is a surname. Notable people with the surname include:

Dominik Humbel, Swiss orienteer
Ruth Humbel (born 1957), Swiss politician and orienteer

See also
Humble (disambiguation)